Dr. William Rickman (17311783) was a prominent figure in the American Revolution, known best as the first Director of Hospitals of the Continental Army in Virginia during the war.

History
His origin and family life has been the issue of conversation for decades and has two schools of thought.

The most prevalent history was produced by Mrs. Claude Randleman in the early 1960s.

The early version has him born in 1715 in Princess Anne County, Virginia and married first to Sarah Van Meter.

The less prevalent and most recent historical research is provided after exhaustive research by the Kittiewan Plantation historian, which should be considered the more accurate source of the history of Dr. William Rickman of Charles City County.  The recent research indicates that he was born in 1731 in England.

Kittiewan Plantation interpretation 
Dr. William Rickman, famous during the American Revolution as the head surgeon of the Continental Army in Virginia, bought several tracts in Charles City County, Virginia, in the 1770s.

In May 1775, Rickman married Elizabeth Harrison, the daughter of Benjamin Harrison V, signer of the Declaration of Independence and owner of nearby Berkeley Plantation [see Virginia Gazette (Purdie), 5 May 1775, p2 c1].  She was also the older sister of William Henry Harrison, the ninth President of the United States.  William and Elizabeth Harrison Rickman had no children.

The name "Kittiewan" was not applied directly to the current property until the early 19th century. Dr. Rickman referred to his home estate as "Millford" in the early 1780s, the first documented name for the tract.  In a 1779 will, Rickman's neighbor to the west, David Minge, mentions several tracts Minge owned including one named "Kittiwan".  The Minge Kittiewan tract was actually the southern part of the current North Bend Plantation adjacent to the west side of Kittiewan Plantation.  Minge's Kittiwan tract is mentioned as such for the last time in the 1783 tax roll, but the acreage can be traced through the records until 1819.  After the Widow Minge married Collier Harrison, her lands were simply listed as "Minges" as late as 1801, and then listed as "Collier Harrison's" for many years after her death until the land passed to her son John Minge prior to 1820.

When Dr. Rickman died in 1783, his widow Elizabeth Harrison Rickman inherited his property, including Millford. Elizabeth Rickman subsequently married John Edmondson around 1789. Her will, drafted in May 1790, specified all of her land was to go to her husband John Edmondson; and upon his death, the Thomas Brown tract was to go to her brother William Henry Harrison, while the  home place would go to Carter Bassett Harrison, another brother.

Although Elizabeth's will specified that he was to receive the Rickman home place, Milford, Carter Bassett Harrison purchased 800 acres including the Milford tract from Elizabeth and John Edmondson in 1791.  The  did not include the Thomas Brown tract, which passed to William Henry Harrison.  Two years later, William Henry Harrison signed a quitclaim deed ceding all claims to "Brown's Quarter" to his brother Carter Bassett Harrison for £25 Virginia money; this is the only instance in the deed books where the word "Quarter" appears with this particular tract.  The quitclaim record also confirmed it as the tract Rickman bought from Brown and the land that was bequeathed to W.H. Harrison by his sister.

After Dr. William Rickman's death, Elizabeth Harrison petitioned Congress to receive bounty land due to her late husband's service during the American Revolution.  She was given land certificates totaling  in Ohio.  She later gave these certificates to her siblings as she had no heir.  After her death, her second husband John Edmondson, who was given the right to live at Millford for life, left Millford and married again; from this marriage he had several children.  From the 1840s to 1870s, the children of this last marriage sued the Harrison family in an attempt to claim the lands in Ohio, but ultimately lost.

There is some speculation that Dr. William Rickman may have had a previous marriage and children before he married Elizabeth Harrison as he was forty-four years old when he married her. This is somewhat unusual because most men in Colonial Virginia married in their mid-twenties.  The descendants of Jesse Rickman of North Carolina believe that Dr. William Rickman was previously married to a Van Meter and had several children by her, before she died ca. 1775, but there is no record of Dr. William Rickman having been previously married, so this cannot be substantiated.

Jess Rickman family interpretation
Dr. William Rickman (possibly born around 1731 – 1783) was a prominent figure in the American Revolution, known best as the first Director of Hospitals of the Continental Army during the war. This title would later evolve into the position of Surgeon General.

Early career 
Possibly born in Hampshire, England to Robert and Tamar Rickman, Rickman may have migrated to the colonies while a young man.  He may have taken up military service and served as a British officer in the French and Indian War. During this time he held the rank of Captain of Regiment 95. Having studied medicine, he was appointed surgeon to the Royal Navy ship HMS Launceston on January 1, 1766. He served on the Launceston for about 3½ years until about August 1769.

A man named William Rickman appears in the records of Charles City County, Virginia in 1770.  The records contain several references to Rickman and his dealings within the county, but none mention a wife or children.  In 1775, the Charles City County William Rickman married Elizabeth Harrison, daughter of the Signer of the Declaration of Independence Benjamin Harrison.  Miss Harrison was the older sister of William Henry Harrison, who would become the 9th President of the United States of America.

American Revolution 
As revolution loomed, Rickman sympathized with his fellow colonists and supported the revolutionary movement.  He frequently corresponded with his friend George Washington regarding the subject and additionally discussed the issues of the day with fellow southerner Thomas Jefferson.  When the war began, the Continental Congress unanimously voted to name Rickman the first Director of Hospitals of the Continental Army.  First overseeing Southern Department during the War, he later inherited the Northern Department as well.

Rickman became disillusioned with the War as he experienced an alarming lack of supplies and manpower to care for the wounded and dying soldiers.  Rickman made numerous trips to Philadelphia to plead for better conditions and additionally wrote numerous letters to various political friends requesting funding for his hospitals.  He received little assistance, however.

Due to his growing frustration with the developing government and his own failing health, Rickman submitted a resignation in April 1780 but was not granted a release until October 1780. He retired with the rank of Colonel.

After The War & Death 
As the Revolution wound to a close, Rickman spent the remainder of his life with his family at his plantation home in Virginia, dubbed Kittiewan.  Rickman remained active in American politics and kept a great deal of correspondence with Washington and Jefferson during these years.

Rickman died in Virginia of unknown causes.

Children
Rickman was a descendant of the English Rickman family which included a number of prominent Quakers.  The Quaker stance of pacifism does much to explain his conflicted opinions about the American Revolution.

William Rickman and his wife Sarah had four children:
 Peter (1760 - Unknown), who was born in England. Peter renounced his allegiance to Great Britain and took the oath of allegiance in the formation  of  Henry County, Virginia.
 John (1765 - Unknown), was also born in England.
 Tamara (1768 - Unknown)
 Jesse Riley (2 May 1770 - 10 March 1860), left home at a young age, fought in the Revolutionary War himself (in North Carolina) and later was a pioneer of the Great Smoky Mountains in Western North Carolina.

After his first wife died, William Rickman married Elizabeth Harrison (1775–1790), sister of William Henry Harrison. They had no children.

Monuments and memorials
Rickman's home and gravesite, Kittewan, is registered as a National Historic Place.

See also
American Revolution

References

External links
Kittewan Plantation (Virginia), Rickman's final home and burial place

1731 births
1783 deaths
Virginia colonial people
Patriots in the American Revolution
People of Virginia in the American Revolution
Political leaders of the American Revolution
British emigrants to the Thirteen Colonies
Physicians in the American Revolution